Persillade is a sauce or seasoning mixture of parsley chopped together with seasonings including garlic, herbs, oil, and vinegar.

In its simplest form, just parsley and garlic, it is a common ingredient in many dishes, part of a sauté cook's mise en place. If added early in cooking, it becomes mellow, but when it is added at the end of cooking or as a garnish, it provides a garlicky jolt. It is extensively used in French and French-influenced cuisines, as well as in Cajun, Louisiana Creole, and Québécois cuisines. 

A classic French and Quebec bistro dish is pommes persillade, cubed potatoes fried in a small amount of oil, with persillade added at the end of the cooking, and can sometimes be combined with Quebec poutine to produce a hybrid dish called poutine persillade. Persillade is also popular in Louisiana; New Orleans chef Austin Leslie's signature dish was fried chicken with persillade.

Variations
There are many variations, either adding other ingredients or substituting other herbs, such as bay leaf, oregano, basil, or tarragon, for the parsley. Combined with bread crumbs, it is used as crust for roasted veal or lamb chops. The addition of lemon zest creates gremolata, a traditional garnish for braised lamb shanks. Anchovy is a common addition in Provençal cooking. A small amount of olive oil is often added to persillade to make it easier to use.

See also
 Gremolata
 Chimichurri
 Green sauce
 List of garlic dishes
 Pesto
 Pistou

References

External links

 Jacques Pepin's recipe for Roe and Liver Persillade
 Jean-Pierre Xiradakis' reflections on his grandmother's Sanguette Persillade

French cuisine
Louisiana cuisine
Cuisine of Quebec
Herb and spice mixtures
Garlic dishes
Sauces
Anchovy dishes